Julie Brown (born 1958) is an American comedic actress, singer and songwriter.

Julie Brown may also refer to:

 Julie Brown (athlete) (born 1955), American long-distance runner
 Downtown Julie Brown (born 1963), English television personality
 Julie Caitlin Brown (born 1961), American television actress who starred in Babylon 5
 Julie K. Brown (born 1961/62), American journalist